Phyllis Blackwell (born 26 March, 1957) is an American former professional tennis player.

Blackwell was raised in Mobile, Alabama and played college tennis for the University of Tennessee at Chattanooga, where she is a member of the Hall of Fame.

Her best performance on the WTA Tour was a semi-final appearance at the Borden Classic in Tokyo in 1982.

In 1983 she was eliminated in the third and final US Open qualifying round for the second successive year, but reached the main draw as a lucky loser, replacing an injured Tracy Austin. She was beaten in the first round by Yvonne Vermaak of South Africa, in an evening match on Grandstand Court.

References

External links
 
 

1957 births
Living people
American female tennis players
Chattanooga Mocs women's tennis players
Tennis people from Alabama
Sportspeople from Mobile, Alabama